The Craft of Research is a book by Wayne C. Booth, Gregory G. Colomb, Joseph M. Williams, Joseph Bizup, and William T. Fitzgerald. The work is published by the University of Chicago Press. The book aims to provide a basic overview of how to research, from the process of selecting a topic and gathering sources to the process of writing results. The book has become a standard text in college composition classes and is now in its fourth edition.

The first edition of The Craft of Research was a winner of the 1995–1996 Critics' Choice Award. Material from The Craft of Research has also been adapted to form the first part of Kate L. Turabian's A Manual for Writers of Research Papers, Theses, and Dissertations.

Structure 
Below is the structure of the work, as outlined in the fourth edition.

Preface: The Aims of This Edition

Part 1: Research, Researchers, and Readers 
Thinking in Print: The Uses of Research, Public and Private
Connecting with Your Reader: Creating a Role for Yourself and Your Readers

Part 2: Asking Questions, Finding Answers 
From Topics to Questions 
From Questions to Problems 
From Problems to Sources 
Engaging Sources

Part 3: Making an Argument 
Making Good Arguments: An Overview 
Making Claims 
Assembling Reasons and Evidence 
Acknowledgments and Responses 
Warrants

Part 4: Writing Your Argument 
Planning and Drafting 
Organizing Your Argument
Incorporating Sources
Communicating Evidence Visually
Introductions and Conclusions
Revising Style: Telling Your Story Clearly

Part 5: Some Last Considerations 
The Ethics of Research
A Postscript for Teachers
Appendix: Bibliographical Resources

Editions

Translations 
 Swedish: Forskning och skrivande: konsten att skriva enkelt och effektivt,  (from 4th ed. 2019)
 Japanese: Risachi no giho,  (from 4th ed. 2018)
 Korean: Haksul nonmun chaksongbop,  (from 4th ed. 2017)
 Chinese: Yan jiu shi yi men yi shu,  (from 2nd ed. 2009)
 Portuguese: A arte da pesquisa,  (from 2nd ed. 2008)
 Spanish: Cómo convertirse en un hábil investigador,  (from 1st ed. 2001)

See also 
 Research design
 Research question

Notes

External links 
 The Craft of Research, Fourth Edition at the University of Chicago Press
 Interview with the authors
 Yale Library Research Guide

1995 non-fiction books
2016 non-fiction books
Style guides
Chicago guides to writing, editing, and publishing